Two ships of the British Royal Navy have been called HMS Tonbridge, after the Kent town:

  was a  launched in 1918 and sold in 1928.
  was a 683-ton civilian ship built in 1924 but requisitioned by the Royal Navy as a netlayer during World War II. It was sunk near Great Yarmouth, Norfolk on 22 August 1941 by the German Air Force with the loss of 35 lives.

See also

References

Royal Navy ship names